Mary Tavy is a village with a population of around 600, located four miles north of Tavistock in Devon in south-west England; it is named after the River Tavy.  There is an electoral ward with the same name. Its population at the 2011 census was 1,559.  Mary Tavy used to be home to the world's largest copper mine Wheal Friendship, as well as a number of lead and tin mines. It lies within Dartmoor National Park. The village lies a mile or two north of Peter Tavy; both were shown as separate settlements in the Domesday Book entry of 1086.

St Mary's Parish Church has a pinnacled west tower built of granite, a south porch with old wagon roof and a south transept built in 1893.

To deter highwaymen from attacking travellers along the road between Tavistock and Okehampton, captured highwaymen were hanged from a gibbet on what is now known as 'Gibbet Hill'.

Mary Tavy hydro-electric power station was built in the 1930s. The station uses water from reservoirs to generate electricity. The Mary Tavy set is rated at 2,622 kW, the Chagford set is rated at 26 kW and the Morwelham set at 700 kW. In the year 1980-81 the total electricity output was 11.91 GWh.

Notable people
 The topographer William Crossing was for part of his life resident at Mary Tavy, and is buried in the churchyard of St Mary.
 The Canadian financier James Henry Plummer was born here..
 The YouTube content producer Sjin was brought up here.

References

External links
 
 

Villages in Devon
Dartmoor